The Council of the People's Deputies (sometimes translated as Council of People's Representatives or Council of People's Commissars) was the name given to the government of the November Revolution in Germany from November 1918 until February 1919. The Council de facto took over the function of head of state (Kaiser) and head of government (Chancellor), and issued decrees replacing the legislation of parliament (Reichstag) and Federal Council. The state secretaries (the heads of the governmental departments, similar to ministers in other countries) stayed in office or were replaced by the Council.

During this period, the main achievements of the Council were the organization of the armistice with the Allies on November 11, 1918, the Reichsrätekongress (General Convention) from 16 to 20 December 1918, and the preparation for the elections for the National Assembly (Nationalversammlung) on 19 January 1919. The Council also reformed the system of suffrage and extended the right to vote to German women for the first time.

Establishment and operation
The Council was formed on 10 November 1918 after the November revolution had swept away the old order. It was established after several thousand revolutionary workers' and soldiers' councils had assembled at Zirkus Busch in Berlin. Their election or appointment had been initiated the day before by the actions of the Revolutionäre Obleute, leaders of the workers who had seized the Reichstag building. This had happened against the will of the leadership of the Social Democrats, led by Friedrich Ebert who had been appointed Chancellor (head of government) on 9 November. Unable to prevent the assembly, Ebert's Social Democrats were able to co-opt the process and ensure that many of the delegates came from among their own supporters. In addition, Ebert managed to convince the more radical Independent Social Democrats to join him in a "unified" socialist government containing three of their members.

Thus a coalition between the Social Democratic Party of Germany (SPD – Sozialdemokratische Partei Deutschlands) and the Independent Social Democratic Party of Germany (USPD – Unabhängige Sozialdemokratische Partei Deutschlands) made up the council. Until 29 December 1918 there were three members from the SPD (Friedrich Ebert, Philipp Scheidemann, Otto Landsberg) and three from the USPD (Hugo Haase, Wilhelm Dittmann, Emil Barth). Ebert and Haase were joint chairmen. The members of the Council had no official portfolios, but Ebert was responsible for military and interior affairs. Since they had no parallel civil service, the Council had to rely on the existing bureaucracy. When the last Imperial Chancellor Prince Max of Baden had handed the office of Reichskanzler to Ebert on 9 November, the Secretaries of State of the Baden cabinet had initially remained in their positions. Although Ebert soon replaced some of them with members of the SPD and other parties, some senior civil servants—like Heinrich Scheuch, the Prussian Minister of War or Wilhelm Solf at the Foreign Office—lasted for weeks or months in office, at least nominally.

The Council was formally in charge of the government when the armistice ending World War I was signed on 11 November 1918. However, Matthias Erzberger, the German envoy, had in fact been sent to negotiate with the allies in the Forest of Compiègne on 6 November by Chancellor Max of Baden, before the latter's resignation on 9 November. The telegram instructing Erzberger to sign on 10 November was sent after a meeting of the old Reichsregierung, originally set up under Prince Max and now chaired by Chancellor Ebert before the Council of the People's Deputies had even been created.

On 12 November 1918, the Council issued a proclamation An das deutsche Volk ("To the people of Germany"), which included the following nine legislative measures:
 The State of Emergency is lifted
 The rights of assembly and association are not subject to any limit. This also applies to civil servants.
 There is no censorship. Censorship of theatrical plays is abolished.
 Freedom of expression in speech and writing 
 Freedom of religion
 Amnesty for all political prisoners. Political trials are discontinued.
 The  is repealed (this had been the legal basis to force all men of eligible age not serving in the military to work in strategic industries)
  (the Prussian Servants' law) and special laws for agricultural workers are repealed.
 The rules for the protection of workers rescinded at the start of the war are restored.

The proclamation went on to promise further social reforms. By 1 January 1919 at the latest, the eight-hour-workday was to be introduced. The government also promised to do everything to provide "sufficient" work. A scheme of unemployment assistance that would distribute the burden between Reich, state and municipality was in the works. The earnings ceiling for health insurance would be raised. The lack of housing would be alleviated through "supply of housing". The government would work towards securing regular nutrition for the people. It would strive to keep up orderly production and protect property against private infringement, as well as personal freedom and safety. Future elections, including that for the constituent assembly, were to be held under a franchise that would be equal, secret, direct and universal, based on proportional representation, and open to all men and women aged 20 and above.

On 15 November 1918, the Council appointed the left wing liberal Hugo Preuss as State Secretary of the Interior and asked him to write a draft of a new republican constitution.

The Council passed the Verordnung über die Wahlen zur verfassunggebenden deutschen Nationalversammlung (Reichswahlgesetz), the law governing the upcoming elections for a national assembly, on 30 November 1918. This codified the changes to the suffrage announced earlier. For the first time in Germany, suffrage was extended to women.

The Council also organized the Reichsrätekongress which met at the Preußisches Abgeordnetenhaus at Leipziger Platz in Berlin from 16 to 20 December 1918. By majority vote, this assembly decided to bring forward the elections to a national assembly to 19 January 1919 and refused a USPD proposal to assume supreme legislative and executive power. However, it also passed a resolution known as Hamburger Punkte that emphasized some key revolutionary demands that were anathema to the military: supreme military command to be with the Council of the People's Deputies, disciplinary authority to reside with the soldiers' councils, election of officers, no rank insignia and no observance of military rank off-duty.

On 18 December 1918, the Council decided in principle to socialize "suitable" industries. No concrete steps in this direction were taken, however, as the SPD members were not keen on any initiatives that were likely to further disrupt the strained food supply or negatively affect industrial productivity. The Council had its hands full with demobilizing and reintegrating 8 million soldiers, withdrawing 3 million of them over the Rhine and ensuring a sufficient supply of coal and food to last the winter. Moreover, there were threats to the Reich's integrity from separatist movements in the Rhineland and from Polish territorial expansion.

On 29 December 1918, the USPD pulled out of the Council. The main point of contention was the military action the government had just taken on 23/24 December against revolting soldiers of the Reichsmarinedivision. This had happened as a result of the Ebert-Groener pact between Friedrich Ebert and Wilhelm Groener of the military high command (OHL). However, there had been talk even before the fighting on Christmas about an impending resignation of the USPD representatives. The vacancies on the Council were filled out with two more SPD members, Gustav Noske and Rudolf Wissell. Although there were no portfolios, Noske was in charge of the military and Wissell of economic affairs. From that point on, the Council's external communications were signed "Reichsregierung" rather than "Rat der Volksbeauftragten".

The government organized elections for a national assembly on 19 January 1919.

End
On 13 February 1919, the Council ceased to exist and formally gave up power to the newly created government of Ministerpräsident Scheidemann. Scheidemann had been appointed by Friedrich Ebert, who in turn had been elected the first temporary president of Germany (Reichspräsident) by the National Assembly.

Members of the Council

References

External links
 Rat der Volksbeauftragten Archives at the International Institute of Social History

Coalition governments of Germany
German Revolution of 1918–1919
Historic German cabinets
1918 establishments in Germany
1919 disestablishments in Germany
Cabinets established in 1918
Cabinets disestablished in 1919
Provisional governments